My Best Friend's Girlfriend  is a 2008 Filipino romantic comedy film, released in 2008 under Regal Films and GMA Pictures.

The movie opened in the Philippines on February 13, 2008, starring Richard Gutierrez and Marian Rivera.

Synopsis
After an awkward yet memorable encounter at a stag party, Evo (Richard Gutierrez) and Grace (Marian Rivera) thought they would never see each other again. Little did they know that Grace is actually the girlfriend of Evo's best friend, Mark (JC de Vera). As the arrogant player that he is, Evo takes advantage of what happened at the party to make Grace agree to his demands. He forces Grace to pretend as his girlfriend to make Akiko (Ehra Madrigal), his ex, jealous.

Cast and characters

Main cast
 Marian Rivera as Grace Villaflor
 Richard Gutierrez as Primitivo "Evo" Gonzales

Extended cast
 JC de Vera as Mark Abo
 Ehra Madrigal as Akiko Solon
 Chariz Solomon as Chicky Chicks
 Marco Morales as Dave Ros
 Renz Valerio as Christian
 Alex Castro as Jun
 Benjie Paras as Dindo
 Pilar Pilapil as Olivia
 JC Cuadrado as Jeffrey
 Deborah Sun as Delia
 Arnold Saulon as Polly
 Paolo Paraiso as Brando

Reception
The movie gained many positive reviews, notably getting a grade B from the Cinema Evaluation Board (CEB) of the Philippines, praising the film's different take on romantic comedies accompanied by strong performances from the lead stars Richard Gutierrez and Marian Rivera. The final gross of the movie is P34m according to box office mojo.

Soundtrack 
 "My Bestfriend's Girlfriend" title track performed by Introvoys
 "All I Need" performed by Shamrock (band)
 "Why Can't It Be" performed by 3rd Avenue

Awards and nominations 

 6th Golden Screen Awards 
 Best Motion Picture—Musical or Comedy - Nominated
 Best Performance by an Actress in a Leading Role—Musical or Comedy - Marian Rivera - Nominated
 Breakthrough Performance by an Actress - Chariz Solomon - Nominated
 40th Box Office Entertainment Awards 
 Valentine Box Office King - Richard Gutierrez
 Valentine Box Office Queen - Marian Rivera
 25th PMPC Star Awards for Movies
 New Movie Actress of the Year - Chariz Solomon - Nominated
 Original Movie Song - My Bestfriend's Girlfriend by Introvoys - Nominated

Awards

References

External links 
 

2008 films
Philippine romantic comedy films
2008 romantic comedy films
2000s teen comedy films
GMA Pictures films
Regal Entertainment films
2000s Tagalog-language films
2000s English-language films
Films directed by Mark A. Reyes